Youbeiping Commandery, or Beiping Commandery was a commandery in imperial China from the Warring States period to Tang dynasty. It was located in present-day Hebei and Tianjin.

Youbeiping Commandery was established by the state of Yan for the defense against the Xiongnu. In Western Han dynasty, it administered 16 counties: Pinggang (平剛), Wuzhong (無終), Shicheng (石成), Tingling (廷陵), Junmi (俊靡), Ci (薋), Xuwu (徐無), Zi (字), Tuyin (土垠), Bailang (白狼), Xiyang (夕陽), Changcheng (昌城), Licheng (驪成), Guangcheng (廣成), Juyang (聚陽) and Pingming (平明). The population in 2 AD was 320,780, in 66,689 households. In Eastern Han, only 4 counties remained, namely Tuyin, Xuwu, Junmi and Wuzhong, while most of the others were abolished. In 140 AD, the population was 53,475, and the households numbered 9,170. In Jin dynasty, the name was changed to Beiping. The population in 280 AD was 5,000 households. In 446 AD during Northern Wei, the commandery was merged into Yuyang Commandery.

In Sui and Tang dynasties, Beiping Commandery became an alternative name of Ping Prefecture (平州). It administered 3 counties, including Lulong (盧龍), Shicheng (石城) and Macheng (馬城). In 742, the population was 25,086, in 3,113 households.

References

Commanderies of the Qin dynasty
Commanderies of the Han dynasty
Commanderies of the Jin dynasty (266–420)
Commanderies of the Sui dynasty